Crane Pond Creek is a stream in Iron and
Wayne counties in the U.S. state of Missouri.

Crane Pond Creek was so named on account of cranes which frequented a pond near its course.

See also
List of rivers of Missouri

References

Rivers of Iron County, Missouri
Rivers of Wayne County, Missouri
Rivers of Missouri